Armonico Hewa is the sixth studio album by Japanese experimental rock band OOIOO. It was released on August 5, 2009 by the labels Commmons and Shock City.

"Armonico Hewa" is a combination of the Spanish word "armonico" and the Swahili word "hewa". The band defines the combination of words as "air in a harmonious state".

Track listing

Personnel
Credits are adapted from the album's liner notes.

OOIOO
 Ai
 Aya
 Kayan
 Yoshimi P-We

Production
 Koichi Hara – engineering
 Isao Kikuchi – mastering
 Yoshimi P-We – production

Design
 Shoji Goto – drawing
 Uta – drawing
 Yoshimi P-We – artwork

Charts

Release history

References

External links
 

2009 albums
OOIOO albums
Avex Group albums
Thrill Jockey albums